Gangiwal is a village in Dharwad district of Karnataka, India.

Demographics 
As of the 2011 Census of India there were 303 households in Gangiwal and a total population of 1,432 consisting of 724 males and 708 females. There were 188 children ages 0-6.

References

Villages in Dharwad district